The 1991 Texas Rangers season involved the Rangers finishing third in the American League West with a record of 85 wins and 77 losses.

Offseason
 December 12, 1990: Scott Coolbaugh was traded by the Rangers to the San Diego Padres for Mark Parent.
 December 14, 1990: Mario Díaz was signed as a free agent with the Texas Rangers.
 January 25, 1991: Rich Gossage was signed as a free agent by the Rangers.

Regular season
 September 30, 1991: Nolan Ryan struck out Tino Martinez for the 5500th strikeout in his career.
 Juan González became the 18th player in Major League history to have a 100 RBI season before his 22nd birthday.

Nolan Ryan's 7th No-Hitter
 May 1, 1991 – Nolan Ryan threw the seventh no-hitter of his career against the Toronto Blue Jays. Of the 122 pitches that Ryan threw, 83 were strikes.

Scorecard
May 1, Arlington Stadium, Arlington, Texas

Batting

Pitching

Season standings

Record vs. opponents

Notable transactions
 April 7, 1991: Denny Walling was signed as a free agent by the Rangers.
 June 2, 1991: Steve Balboni was signed as a free agent by the Rangers.
 June 22, 1991: Denny Walling was released by the Rangers.
 July 21, 1991: Jonathan Hurst, Joey Eischen and a player to be named later were traded by the Rangers to the Montreal Expos for Oil Can Boyd. The Texas Rangers completed their trade by sending Travis Buckley (minors) to the Expos on September 1.

Roster

Player stats

Batting

Starters by position
Note: Pos = Position; G = Games played; AB = At bats; H = Hits; Avg. = Batting average; HR = Home runs; RBI = Runs batted in

Other batters
Note: G = Games played; AB = At bats; H = Hits; Avg. = Batting average; HR = Home runs; RBI = Runs batted in

Pitching

Starting pitchers
Note: G = Games pitched; IP = Innings pitched; W = Wins; L = Losses; ERA = Earned run average; SO = Strikeouts

Other pitchers
Note: G = Games pitched; IP = Innings pitched; W = Wins; L = Losses; ERA = Earned run average; SO = Strikeouts

Relief pitchers
Note: G = Games pitched; W = Wins; L = Losses; SV = Saves; ERA = Earned run average; SO = Strikeouts

Awards and honors
 Julio Franco, A.L. Batting Title
 Julio Franco, Silver Slugger Award
 José Guzmán, Comeback Player of The Year
All-Star Game

Farm system

References

External links
1991 Texas Rangers at Baseball Reference
1991 Texas Rangers at Baseball Almanac

Texas Rangers seasons
Texas Rangers season
Range